The following is a list of business schools in New Zealand.

 Auckland University of Technology School of Business - Auckland University of Technology
 AUT School of Business
 University of Canterbury Business School - University of Canterbury
 EIT Faculty of Business and Computing - Eastern Institute of Technology
 Lincoln University Faculty of Commerce - Lincoln University
 Massey College of Business - Massey University
 Open Polytechnic of New Zealand School of Business - The Open Polytechnic of New Zealand
 Otago Business School - University of Otago
 University of Auckland Business School - University of Auckland
 University of Waikato Management School - University of Waikato
 Victoria Business School - Victoria University of Wellington
 Waikato Management School

References

 
New Zealand